Frank Hosmar (born 20 August 1968) is a Dutch Paralympic equestrian. He is a bronze medalist at the 2012 Summer Paralympics and the 2016 Summer Paralympics. He won also various medals at the World Equestrian Games and gold medalist at the European Championships in 2015, 2017 and 2019.

References

1968 births
Living people
Dutch male equestrians
Dutch dressage riders
Paralympic silver medalists for the Netherlands
Paralympic bronze medalists for the Netherlands
Equestrians at the 2012 Summer Paralympics
Equestrians at the 2016 Summer Paralympics
Medalists at the 2016 Summer Paralympics
Medalists at the 2012 Summer Paralympics
Paralympic medalists in equestrian
Paralympic equestrians of the Netherlands
Medalists at the 2020 Summer Paralympics
Equestrians at the 2020 Summer Paralympics
20th-century Dutch people
21st-century Dutch people